San Simon School District 18  is a school district in Cochise County, Arizona.

References

External links

School districts in Cochise County, Arizona